The Rock is a studio album by the Polish progressive rock band SBB. The album was released on 29 October 2007 by the label Metal Mind Productions. The album reached No. 30 on the OLiS chart in Poland.

Track listing 

Bonus tracks:

Personnel 

 Józef Skrzek – vocals, bass guitar, keyboards
 Apostolis Anthimos – guitar
  – drums, percussion
 Tamás Somló – vocals (9)

Charts

References 

2007 albums
SBB (band) albums